Southern Liech State was a state in South Sudan that existed between 2 October 2015 and 22 February 2020. It was located in the Greater Upper Nile region and it bordered Northern Liech to the north, Western Bieh to the east, Jonglei to the southeast, Eastern Lakes to the south, Western Lakes to the southwest, and Tonj to the west.

History
On 2 October 2015, President Salva Kiir issued a decree establishing 28 states in place of the 10 constitutionally established states. The decree established the new states largely along ethnic lines. A number of opposition parties and civil society groups challenged the constitutionality of the decree. Kiir later resolved to take it to parliament for approval as a constitutional amendment. In November the South Sudanese parliament empowered President Kiir to create new states.

Teker Riek Dong was appointed Governor on 24 December.

Administrative divisions
The state consisted of 9 counties:

Rubkway County
Mayiandit County
Tharjiath-bour County
Panyinjiar County
Nyal County
Ganyliel County
Dhor-wang County
Bou County
Thornyor County

References

Greater Upper Nile
States of South Sudan